Jan Fulop (born 1949 in Slovakia) is a Slovakian football manager who last worked as head coach of the Nicaragua national football team.

Career
Fulop started his managerial career with Buffalos do Tonos Managua. In 1985, he was appointed head coach of the Nicaragua national football team, a position he held until 1986.

References

External links 
 An unforgettable adventure 
 Ján Fülöp left a big mark in Nitra and also in Nicaragua
 Nicaragua's meeting after 30 years pleased him
 Ján Fülop has 70 
 Ján Fülöp má sedemdesiat rokov 

1949 births
Living people
Slovak expatriate football managers
Nicaragua national football team managers
Czechoslovak football managers
Slovak people of Hungarian descent